The following lists events that happened in 1927 in the Imperial State of Persia.

Incumbents
 Shah: Reza Shah
 Prime Minister: Mostowfi ol-Mamalek (until June 2), Mehdi Qoli Hedayat (starting June 2)

Events

Births
date unknown – Bijan Jalali, poet (died 2000)

Deaths
 December 26 – Abolqasem Naser ol-Molk, 5th Prime Minister of Iran and former Regent (born 1856)

References

 
1920s in Iran
Years of the 20th century in Iran
Persia
Persia